Georges Azenstarck (1934 – 2 September 2020) was a French photographer.

Biography
Azenstarck was a reporter-photographer for L'Humanité from 1956 to 1968, when he created an association for reporter-photographers alongside his colleagues Marcel Delius, Louis Lucchesi, and Jean-Claude Seine. He also began working for La Nouvelle Vie Ouvrière. He joined the photographic agency Rapho in 1979 and traveled to over fifty countries. He was one of the few photographers to cover the Ratonnades and the May 68 protests. He worked for Roger-Viollet until his retirement.

Georges Azenstarck died in Marseille on 2 September 2020.

Bibliography
Les Rudiments du monde
Le Siècle du dragon : un reportage et quelques réflexions sur la Chine d'aujourd'hui et peut-être de demain
Ces patrons éclairés qui craignent la lumière
Mon copain de Pékin

References

French photographers
1934 births
2020 deaths